Nobel Son is a 2007 American black comedy about a dysfunctional family dealing with the kidnapping of their son for ransom following the father's winning of the Nobel Prize in Chemistry. The film features Alan Rickman as the prize-winning professor and Mary Steenburgen as his wife, with Bryan Greenberg as their kidnapped son.

Principal photography for Nobel Son started on October 6, 2005, in Venice Beach, California, and ended on November 17, 2005. The official trailer and website were released on January 12, 2007.

Plot
Eli Michaelson (Alan Rickman), a self-involved chemistry professor, learns he has been awarded the Nobel Prize. After verbally abusing his wife, son, colleagues, and nominal girlfriend, he heads off to Sweden with his wife, Sarah (Mary Steenburgen), to collect his award. His son, Barkley (Bryan Greenberg), misses the flight.

Barkley Michaelson has chosen to study not chemistry but anthropology, and this perceived failure triggers constant torrents of abuse from his father. His missing the flight, though, is the apparently innocent result of having been kidnapped by the deranged Thaddeus James (Shawn Hatosy), who claims to be Eli Michaelson's son by the wife of a former colleague. Thaddeus successfully obtains a ransom of $2 million, which he then splits with Barkley who, it appears, has orchestrated the kidnapping to obtain money from his father.

Shortly after Barkley's release, Thaddeus rents a garage apartment from the Michaelsons and begins to charm Eli with his knowledge of chemistry. Barkley undertakes a campaign of psychological terror aimed at Thaddeus and his girlfriend, performance artist City Hall (Eliza Dushku). This ultimately results in the death of Thaddeus and commitment to a mental hospital for City.

Meanwhile, Barkley kidnaps Eli and threatens to expose the scientific fraud that led to Eli receiving a Nobel Prize that he did not deserve. Eli's long-suffering wife, Sarah, demands a divorce while praising her son for his devious behavior.

In the final scenes, Sarah, Barkley, and Sarah's police detective boyfriend, Max Mariner (Bill Pullman) are seen on a tropical beach. Mariner appears to have been in the dark through most of the movie, but has figured out towards the end that he wants to be with Sarah and can live with the theft of $2 million from her scoundrel husband. Eli is seen in his classroom unrepentantly flirting with another student. He has lost his wife, son, and the money, but he still has his Nobel Prize and the professor position.

Cast
 Alan Rickman as Eli Michaelson, a philandering chemistry professor who wins the Nobel Prize in Chemistry.
 Bryan Greenberg as Barkley Michaelson, the down-on-his-luck college student son of Eli Michaelson, who is kidnapped for ransom following his father's winning of the Nobel Prize.
 Shawn Hatosy as Thaddeus James, Barkley's kidnapper with a dark past.
 Mary Steenburgen as Sarah Michaelson, a forensic psychiatrist; wife of Eli and mother of Barkley.
 Bill Pullman as Max Mariner, the police detective investigating Barkley's kidnapping.
 Eliza Dushku as City Hall, a local poet/artist on whom Barkley has a crush.
 Danny DeVito as George Gastner, the Michaelsons' guest house tenant who is learning to control his obsessive-compulsive disorder.
Lindy Booth as Beth Chapman, a grad student who’s having an affair with Eli

Cameos include Ted Danson and Tracey Walter as university colleagues of Eli Michaelson, and Ernie Hudson as a police detective aiding in the ransom negotiation.

Release
The film was screened from April 28 – May 2, 2007 at the 2007 Tribeca Film Festival in New York City. The entire cast attended the premiere and all of the screenings were sold-out. It received broadly negative reviews, with only a 23% "rotten" rating on Rotten Tomatoes,. Manohla Dargis, writing for The New York Times described the film as "an aggressively noisy exercise in style over substance about nasty people doing nasty things to one another." Roger Ebert gave it a positive review. The film was also called "entertaining" by a reviewer on Ain't It Cool News.

Over a year after its initial public screening at the Tribeca Film Festival, Nobel Son was picked up for distribution by Freestyle Releasing and was released in theaters on December 5, 2008.

Reception
The film was widely panned by critics. Rotten Tomatoes reports that 25% of critics gave positive reviews based on 65 reviews, with an average score of 4.2/10. The site's consensus reads, "Despite the best efforts of a strong cast, Nobel Son is over-plotted and self-consciously odd." Metacritic, based on a normalized rating from 100 top reviews from mainstream critics, gave the film an average score of 28/100, based on 18 critics, indicating "generally unfavorable reviews".

References

External links
 
 
 Eliza Dushku confirms Nobel Son (wizarduniverse.com)

2007 films
2000s crime thriller films
American black comedy films
Films directed by Randall Miller
Films about fictional Nobel laureates
2000s English-language films
2000s American films